Group 3 of the UEFA Euro 1968 qualifying tournament was one of the eight groups to decide which teams would qualify for the UEFA Euro 1968 finals tournament. Group 3 consisted of four teams: Soviet Union, Greece, Austria, and Finland, where they played against each other home-and-away in a round-robin format. The group winners were the Soviet Union, who finished 5 points above Greece.

Final table

Matches

Goalscorers

Notes

References
 
 
 

Group 1
1966 in Soviet football
1967 in Soviet football
1966–67 in Greek football
1967–68 in Greek football
1966–67 in Austrian football
1967–68 in Austrian football
1966 in Finnish football
1967 in Finnish football
Soviet Union at UEFA Euro 1968